The South American qualification tournament for the 2015 FIVB Volleyball Men's World Cup was held in Cali, Colombia from 19 to 23 May 2015. The top two teams qualified for the 2015 World Cup.

Teams
 (Hosts)

Venue

Pool standing procedure
 Number of matches won
 Match points
 Sets ratio
 Points ratio
 Result of the last match between the tied teams

Match won 3–0 or 3–1: 3 match points for the winner, 0 match points for the loser
Match won 3–2: 2 match points for the winner, 1 match point for the loser

Preliminary round
All times are Colombia Time (UTC−05:00).

|}

|}

Final round
All times are Colombia Time (UTC−05:00).

Semifinals

|}

3rd place match

|}

Final

|}

Final standing

Awards

Most Valuable Player
  Liberman Agamez
Best Setter
  Luciano De Cecco
Best Outside Spikers
  Vicente Parraguirre
  Nicolás Bruno

Best Middle Blockers
  Pablo Crer
  Iván Márquez
Best Opposite Spiker
  Federico Martina
Best Libero
  Facundo Santucci

See also
2015 FIVB Volleyball Women's World Cup – South American Qualification

References

External links
Official website

Qualification
South American
Volleyball
International volleyball competitions hosted by Colombia
Sport in Cali